Earthquakes in Bangladesh are frequent and often cause damage. The earthquakes occur due to a convergent boundary between the Indian Plate and the Eurasian Plate.

Earthquakes

References

Bangladesh
Earthquakes